Tongass Island, historically also spelled Tongas Island, is an island in the southern Alaska Panhandle, near the marine boundary with Canada at 54–40 N. It was the site of Fort Tongass, which was established shortly after the Alaska Purchase as a customs port for travelers bound from British Columbian waters to the Stikine River, which was one of the main routes of access to the Cassiar Gold Rush of the 1870s. It lies west of Port Tongass in Nakat Bay, adjacent to the Dixon Entrance and is 0.8 miles in length. Its Native Alaskan name "Kut-tuk-wah" was published in 1869 by the United States Coast and Geodetic Survey; its current name was first published in 1891.

See also
Tongass National Forest

References

Islands of the Alexander Archipelago
Islands of Ketchikan Gateway Borough, Alaska
Islands of Alaska